The  is a private non-lending library and resource center in San Francisco's Japantown for the collection and preservation of materials relating to Japanese Americans.  It has been in operation since 1969.

The library's collection consists of the following:

 Books related to Japanese-Americans and Asian-Americans
 Periodicals, including magazines, newsletters, journals, newspapers, and newspaper clippings. 
 Reference materials and general information about Japanese-American and Asian-American organizations, as well as information about Japanese-American artists and writers

The Japanese American National Library also contains an extensive archival collection. The most notable collection includes the archives of the Japanese American Citizens League Legislative Education Committee (JACL-LEC), an organization created to promote redress that ultimately became the Civil Liberties Act of 1988.

History
A national Japanese American Library began in 1967 as an idea shared between two individuals, Karl Matsushita and Tetsuden Kashima. However, the project did not come to fruition until 1969 with the onset of strikes throughout San Francisco State, wherein which students demanded the creation of an ethnic studies programs at the university. Karl Matsushita and Tetsuden Kashima began compiling basic curriculum materials, with the bulk of the early collection coming from donations made by those involved within the project. These funds and saving were given to help the library buy books, while additional materials were bequeathed to the library from local newspapers and authors. 

After its relatively humble origin, the Japanese American Library under the leadership of their director Matsushita was able to move the library's location to a new space in the Nichibei Kai building in San Francisco's Japantown. Prior to this move much of the collection had been housed within personal garages and basements due to limited space. However, the continuously increasing collection resulted in the library have to more again in 1987 to its current location at 1619 Sutter Street, on the first floor of the Hinode Towers.   

The library is dedicated to collecting and preserving materials and objects which pertain to the history and identity of the Japanese American people. They regard their primary purpose as establishing a library/resource center to preserve Japanese American cultural heritage, promote interest in Japanese American heritage, provide information relating to the needs of the Japanese American community, as well as serving as a bridge between the Japanese community and the general American public. Today the Japanese American National Library contains one of the most important and comprehensive collections on the history of the Japanese in the United States.

See also

 Densho: The Japanese American Legacy Project
 Japanese American National Museum
 Japanese American Citizens League
 Japanese American Committee for Democracy
 History of the Japanese in San Francisco

References

External links
 

Japanese-American culture in San Francisco
Ethnic libraries
Libraries in San Francisco
Japanese-American history
Libraries in California